Jakeš is a village in the municipality of Vukosavlje, Republika Srpska, Bosnia and Herzegovina.

References

Populated places in Vukosavlje